The Singh Krora or Karorsinghia Misl, also known as the Panjgarhia Misl, was a Sikh misl.

Sirdar Karora Singh Virk, resident of Barki (district Lahore) was the first chief of this Misl; earlier, Karora Singh was the deputy of the jatha led by Sirdar Sham Singh of village Narli (district Lahore); after the death of Sham Singh in 1739, Sirdar Karam Singh Uppal (of village Pechgarh) became the chief of this Jatha; he too died in early days of 1748 and Karora Singh became the chief of the Jatha.

In March 1748, when the Misls were formed, his jatha became a Misl; then this jatha came to known as Karorsinghia Misl. Karora Singh had the command of 7-8 thousand horsemen; his first possessions were Hariana and Sham Churasi (in Hoshiarpur district); Karora Singh died in the Battle of Taravari in 1761.

Karora Singh was succeeded by Baghel Singh Dhaliwal of Jhabal (district Amritsar); Baghel Singh was fond of adventures; he left the Majha area and launched his actions in Karnal, Saharanpur and other areas of Gang-Doab; he was one of those five generals who unfurled blue Khalsa flag on Red Fort at Delhi on the 11th of March 1783.

Baghel Singh had an army of thirty thousand soldiers; the ground where his army used to pitch its tents is still known as Tees Hazari (literally: associated with thirty thousands). Baghel Singh died in 1802; he was succeeded by his wive Ratan Kaur.

Leaders

See also 

 Kalsia State

References

Further reading

Misls